Isandra is a district of Haute Matsiatra in Madagascar.

Communes
The district is further divided into 13 communes:

 Ambalamidera Ambohimanana
 Ambalamidera II
 Ambondrona
 Andoharanomaintso
 Andreamalama
 Anjoma Itsara
 Ankarinarivo Manirisoa
 Fanjakana
 Iavinomby-Vohibola
 Isorana
 Mahazoarivo
 Nasandratrony
 Soatanana

Roads
 National road 42 from Fianarantsoa to Ikalamavony crosses this district.

See also
 the cliffs & caves of Isandra.

References

l'Intracommunatité Isandra 

Districts of Haute Matsiatra